The Bishop of Ribe, in Denmark, may refer to a bishop of either:

 the former Roman Catholic diocese of Ribe, dissolved in 1536: see Ancient Diocese of Ribe; or
 the present Lutheran Diocese of Ribe